Dirk Copeland (born September 5, 1972) is an American former cyclist. He competed at the 1992 Summer Olympics and the 1996 Summer Olympics.

References

External links

1972 births
Living people
American male cyclists
Olympic cyclists of the United States
Cyclists at the 1992 Summer Olympics
Cyclists at the 1996 Summer Olympics
Cyclists from Los Angeles
Pan American Games medalists in cycling
Pan American Games silver medalists for the United States
American track cyclists
Cyclists at the 1991 Pan American Games
Medalists at the 1991 Pan American Games